Patricia (Pat) Buckley Moss, also known as P. Buckley Moss, is an American artist. She was born on May 20, 1933, in Richmond County (Staten Island Borough) of New York City. Raised on Staten Island, she was the second of three children of an Irish American-Sicilian marriage.

She lives in Virginia.

Early life and education
Born Patricia Buckley (called Pat) on Staten Island in New York City. In grade school, young Moss was perceived as a poor student, a circumstance probably attributable to dyslexia. Nonetheless, one of her teachers determined she, who was “Not Proficient in Anything,” was artistically gifted.  This outside opinion helped to convince her mother to enroll her daughter in an extraordinary public school for girls in downtown Manhattan, Washington Irving High School for the Fine Arts in Manhattan.

In 1951, Moss received a scholarship to study art at Cooper Union College.

Marriage and family
Soon after graduating in 1955, Buckley married Jack Moss.  In 1964, Mr. Moss' work as a chemical engineer found the family of seven with a sixth child on the way relocating to Waynesboro, Virginia.  This relocation would become pivotal in Moss' art and subject matter. In 1979, she divorced Jack Moss, remarrying again in 1982 to business manager Malcolm Henderson, whom she later divorced.  The build-up of Moss Galleries, Ltd. resulted from the influence of Moss' marriage to Henderson. She has ten grandchildren.

Art career
In 1964, Jack Moss' work took the family to Waynesboro, Virginia in the Shenandoah Valley. Patricia Moss appreciated the rural scenery and began portraying it in her art. She was particularly drawn to the Amish and Mennonite people who farmed in the countryside and has portrayed their figures in iconic ways. In 1967 she had a one-person museum exhibition that promptly sold out, after which Moss started to market her work more seriously. Her work subsequently received acclaim.

Referred to in 1988 as "The People's Artist," by journalist Charles Kuralt, Moss opened the P. Buckley Moss Museum in Waynesboro the following year. Since opening in 1989, the facility has grown to attract roughly 45,000 visitors annually. Kuralt's moniker is often used in the museum's marketing as in her artwork. Today, artwork that Moss signs as P. Buckley Moss is represented in galleries.

Civic activities 
Moss has become a strong advocate for special education groups. Overcoming her own challenges with dyslexia, Pat has become a role model for the learning impaired and has shared her message with special education classes throughout the United States. Events and donations of Moss’ original works and prints to related children’s charities have raised millions of dollars for their causes. The P. Buckley Moss Society was established by a few dedicated collectors in 1987, with a mission to assist and join the artist in her charitable endeavors. The Society has grown to include twenty-three chapters and a membership of approximately 8,000 members. In 1995, Moss founded the P. Buckley Moss Foundation for Children's Education to aid children with learning disabilities.

In addition to her work with special education, P. Buckley Moss has continued to raise money and awareness for breast cancer. A breast cancer survivor herself, Moss continues to donate art and hand painted quilts to benefit organizations that offer support to breast cancer patients.

References

External links

"Horsing around: P. Buckley Moss and not-folk art", The Hook, 3 May 2007
P. Buckley Moss, Virginia Women in History, Library of Virginia
P. Buckley Moss Society (www.mosssociety.org)
P. Buckley Moss Foundation for Children’s Education (www.mossfoundation.org)

1933 births
Living people
People from Staten Island
Cooper Union alumni
American women painters
Painters from New York City
People from Waynesboro, Virginia
Painters from Virginia
20th-century American painters
20th-century American women artists
21st-century American painters
21st-century American women artists